Herbert Anijekwu (4 December 1964 – 20 September 2013) was a Nigerian footballer who played as a defender. He played in six matches for the Nigeria national football team in 1990 and 1991. He was also named in Nigeria's squad for the 1990 African Cup of Nations tournament.

References

1964 births
2013 deaths
Nigerian footballers
Nigeria international footballers
1990 African Cup of Nations players
Place of birth missing
Association football defenders
Rangers International F.C. players